Into My Heart is a 1998 motion picture featuring Rob Morrow and Claire Forlani. It premiered at the Venice Film Festival on September 9, 1998, the drama documents a love triangle involving a woman and two childhood friends, focusing on the themes of marriage, adultery and betrayal. It was written and directed by Anthony Stark and Sean Smith.

Plot
Ben and Adam are best friends from childhood. While Adam marries Nina after college, Ben’s after a number of unsuccessful relationships marries Kat. Ben and Nina starts an adulterous relationship. When Adam comes to know about Nina’s affair with Ben, he jumps from a tower resulting into his coma. Five years later, Ben notices Nina in a restaurant and approaches her. It is revealed that Nina has moved to London and married and has a child now. Ben and Kat have separated and Kat is going to marry someone. Adam is presumably dead.

Cast
 Rob Morrow as Ben
 Claire Forlani as Nina
 Jake Weber as Adam
 Jayne Brook as Kat
 Sebastian Roche as Chris
 Nora Ariffin as The Waitress

References

External links
 Into My Heart on Internet Movie Database
 
Reviews
Best Friends on Best Friends. New York Times (May 2000)
Review from Variety
Review by Andrew Sarris from Observer
Review from Christian Science Monitor

1998 drama films
1998 films
American drama films
Films scored by Michael Small
1990s English-language films
1990s American films